Gordon W. "Tiny" Thomas (18 August 1921 – 10 April 2013) was a British cyclist who competed at the 1948 Summer Olympics in London. There he won a silver medal in the team road race alongside Bob Maitland and Ian Scott. He also competed in the individual event, finishing 8th in a field of 101 participants. Born in Shipley, West Riding of Yorkshire, he served during World War II with the Royal Artillery in Africa and Italy. After his Olympic experience, he went on to win the 1953 Tour of Britain before retiring from cycling to enter the wool business.

References

1921 births
2013 deaths
British Army personnel of World War II
English male cyclists
Olympic cyclists of Great Britain
Cyclists at the 1948 Summer Olympics
Olympic silver medallists for Great Britain
Olympic medalists in cycling
Royal Artillery personnel
Sportspeople from Shipley, West Yorkshire
Cyclists from Yorkshire
Medalists at the 1948 Summer Olympics
Military personnel from Yorkshire